

Dunn was a medieval Bishop of Rochester. He was consecrated probably around 740. He died in 747.

Citations

References

External links
 

Bishops of Rochester
8th-century English bishops
747 deaths
Year of birth unknown